Madison National Forest was established as the Madison Forest Reserve by the General Land Office in Montana on August 16, 1902, with . After the transfer of federal forests to the U.S. Forest Service in 1905, it became a National Forest on March 4, 1907. On December 16, 1931, Madison was divided between Beaverhead, Gallatin and Deerlodge National Forests and the name was discontinued.

See also
 List of forests in Montana

References

External links
Forest History Society
Listing of the National Forests of the United States and Their Dates (from the Forest History Society website) Text from Davis, Richard C., ed. Encyclopedia of American Forest and Conservation History. New York: Macmillan Publishing Company for the Forest History Society, 1983. Vol. II, pp. 743-788.

Former National Forests of Montana
1902 establishments in Montana